U Sports women's soccer is the highest level of play at the university level under the auspices of U Sports, Canada's governing body for university sports. As of the 2021 season, 53 teams from Canadian universities are divided into four conferences, drawing from the four conferences of U Sports: Canada West, Ontario University Athletics, Réseau du sport étudiant du Québec, and Atlantic University Sport. After interconference playoffs have been played, eight teams compete for the Gladys Bean Memorial Trophy, awarded to the U Sports women's soccer championship winner.

Season structure

Regular season
The regular season is eight to nine weeks long, depending on the conference. Teams play between 12 and 16 regular season games, depending on conference or division, with teams typically playing a home and home series with every other team in their conference or division. All regular season games are in-conference. Following the conclusion of the regular season, the Chantal Navert Memorial award is awarded annually to the Player of the Year in U Sports women's soccer.

Playoffs
After the regular season, single elimination playoff games are held between the top teams in each conference to determine conference champions. In the Canada West and Quebec conferences, the top four teams qualify for the playoffs, with the fourth and first seeded teams playing one match and the third and second seeded teams playing another. The two winning teams then play for the conference championship. Because there are more teams in the Atlantic conference, the top six teams qualify, with the top two teams receiving a first-round bye. The sixth and third seeded teams play one match and the fifth and fourth seeded teams play another. The winning teams then go on to play the top two seeded teams, with the lowest remaining seed playing the first seeded team and the highest remaining seed playing the second seeded team. The winners of these two semi-final matches then play for the Atlantic conference championship.

The Ontario playoff system operates much like the Atlantic one, except it functions for both the West and East divisions. The top six teams from each division (twelve total) qualify for the playoffs, with the top two seeds of each division receiving byes. The champions of each division then play for the OUA conference championship. Because the OUA has 12 teams competing, it necessitates a longer post-season schedule. Consequently, the first round of the playoffs in the OUA occurs during the same week that each of the other three conferences are playing their last regular season games. The four conference champions automatically qualify for the U Sports Women's Soccer Championship.

Women's Soccer Championship

The U Sports Women's Soccer Championship, first established in 1987, features eight teams in single elimination matches to determine a national champion. The championship hosts 11 games over four days at a predetermined host venue. The host team is automatically qualified for the tournament, as is each of the conference champions. Another berth is awarded to the second-place finisher in the Ontario conference and Canada West conference. The final spot is given to one team from one of the three remaining conferences on a yearly rotational basis.

Teams

Atlantic University Sport

Canada West Universities Athletic Association

Ontario University Athletics

Réseau du sport étudiant du Québec

References

External links
 

University and college soccer in Canada
Sports leagues established in 1987
1987 establishments in the United States
Women's college association football
Women's soccer competitions in Canada